David or Dave Knight may refer to:

David Knight (American football) (born 1951), former American football player
David Knight (CND), chair for the Campaign for Nuclear Disarmament 1996–2001
David Knight (cricketer) (born 1956), Australian cricketer
David Knight (English footballer) (born 1987), English footballer
David Knight (motorcyclist) (born 1978), enduro rider from the Isle of Man
David Knight (musician) (born 1978), American singer and music composer
David Knight (politician) (born 1969), state representative in the U.S. state of Georgia
David M. Knight (1936–2018), English professor of history and philosophy of science
Dave Knight, American slalom canoeist
Dave Knight (baseball), American baseball player
Dave Simpson (soccer) (born 1983), David Simpson Knight, Canadian soccer player
Tuffy Knight (born 1936), David "Tuffy" Knight, Canadian football coach

See also
David Knights (born 1945), English musician